Free Radio San Diego (96.9 FM) was an unlicensed radio station located in San Diego, California.  The founders claim that its creation was a reaction to Federal Communications Commission restrictions on new radio licenses.  They provided a commercial-free unlicensed broadcast beginning on October 13, 2002 — with occasional interruptions due to FCC raids and technical issues.  The open-format music selection was chosen by DJ preference but was weighted towards punk rock.  Also featured were syndicated news programs such as Democracy Now! and Free Speech Radio News.

FCC enforcement actions
On July 21, 2005, U.S. Marshals and the Federal Communications Commission carried out a raid against Free Radio San Diego, effectively seizing all of their broadcast equipment. The station resumed broadcasting three months later from a new location.

The station did not broadcast over-the-air from January to October 2007, as a result of a $10,000 Notice Of Apparent Liability (NAL) For Forfeiture, which was later reduced to $750. However, it continued to broadcast online, via Internet.

, Christian radio station KRTM, based in Murrieta, California, is using the 96.9 frequency for K245AI, a licensed broadcast translator of their main station.  This translator on the same frequency is now used for Latin pop station KLQV, owned by Univision Communications.

References

Radio stations in San Diego
Pirate radio stations in the United States
Defunct radio stations in the United States
Radio stations established in 2002
2002 establishments in California
Defunct mass media in California 
2007 disestablishments in California 
Radio stations disestablished in 2007